Acacia holotricha is a shrub belonging to the genus Acacia and the subgenus Phyllodineae that is native to parts of north eastern Australia.

Description
Like most species of Acacia it has phyllodes rather than true leaves. Following flowering thinly coriaceous seed pods are produced that have a linear shape and are rounded over and constricted between the seeds.

Taxonomy
The species was first formally described by the botanist Leslie Pedley in 1980 in the work A revision of Acacia Mill. in Queensland as published in the journal Austrobaileya. It was reclassified by Pedley in 1987 as Racosperma holotrichum then transferred back to genus Acacia in 2001.

Distribution
The shrub has a limited distribution in south eastern Queensland from around Taroom in the south and up to around Duaringa in the north.

See also
 List of Acacia species

References

holotricha
Flora of Queensland
Plants described in 1980
Taxa named by Leslie Pedley